The 1955 Kansas City Athletics season was the 55th season for the franchise in MLB's American League, and the 1st season in Kansas City after playing the previous 54 in Philadelphia. The team won 63 games – only the fifth time in 20 years that they won more than 60 games – and lost 91, finishing sixth in the American League, 33 games behind the AL Champion New York Yankees.

Offseason 
In 1954, the Mack family decided to sell the Philadelphia Athletics. Charlie Finley made an offer to purchase the team, but was refused. Clint Murchison also made an offer to purchase the team with plans to relocate to Southern California, but was also refused. On October 12, 1954, the owners approved the sale of the Athletics to Chicago businessman Arnold Johnson, who moved the team from Philadelphia to Kansas City for the 1955 season. Finley would later buy the A's from Johnson's estate in 1960.  Murchison's son, Clint Jr., would later become one of the founders of the National Football League's Dallas Cowboys franchise in 1960.

In 1955, the new Kansas City Athletics drew 1,393,054 to Municipal Stadium.

Notable transactions 
 Prior to 1955 season: Bob Davis was signed as an amateur free agent by the Athletics.

Spring training 
The A's and Philadelphia Phillies had played a Philadelphia City Series since 1903. The Kansas City A's returned to Philadelphia at the end of spring training in 1955, and the teams played two games. The A's beat the Phillies in the second game, 10–2, at Wilmington Park, home of the original Wilmington Blue Rocks.
Both games were played at Wilmington Park, Wilmington, Delaware, on April 9 and April 10, 1955, immediately prior to the start of the regular season.

Regular season

Opening game
The first game in Kansas City's Major League history was played at home at Municipal Stadium on Tuesday, April 12, 1955, before 32,147 fans. Facing the Detroit Tigers, the Athletics broke a 2–2 deadlock in the sixth inning with a three-run rally keyed by pinch hitter Don Bollweg's two-run single, and went on to win, 6–2. The A's other batting star was center fielder Bill Wilson, who collected three hits and a base on balls, scoring three runs, in four plate appearances; one of his hits was the first home run in Kansas City MLB annals, a solo blast in the eighth inning. Left-hander Alex Kellner got the victory, while former Cincinnati Reds star Ewell Blackwell pitched three scoreless innings in relief for the save.

Starting lineup

Season standings

Record vs. opponents

Notable transactions 
 May 11, 1955: Sonny Dixon and cash were traded by the Athletics to the New York Yankees for Enos Slaughter and Johnny Sain.
 May 31, 1955: Clete Boyer was signed as an amateur free agent (bonus baby) by the Athletics.
 May 1955: Al Sima was traded by the Athletics to the Washington Senators for Gus Keriazakos.
 September 10, 1955: Joe Ginsberg was purchased by the Athletics from the Seattle Rainiers.
 September 12, 1955: Glenn Cox was purchased by the Athletics from the Brooklyn Dodgers.

Roster

Player stats

Batting

Starters by position 
Note: Pos = Position; G = Games played; AB = At bats; H = Hits; Avg. = Batting average; HR = Home runs; RBI = Runs batted in

Other batters 
Note: G = Games played; AB = At bats; H = Hits; Avg. = Batting average; HR = Home runs; RBI = Runs batted in

Pitching

Starting pitchers 
Note: G = Games played; IP = Innings pitched; W = Wins; L = Losses; ERA = Earned run average; SO = Strikeouts

Other pitchers 
Note: G = Games pitched; IP = Innings pitched; W = Wins; L = Losses; ERA = Earned run average; SO = Strikeouts

Relief pitchers 
Note: G = Games pitched; W = Wins; L = Losses; SV = Saves; ERA = Earned run average; SO = Strikeouts

Awards and honors 

All-Star Game
Jim Finigan, third baseman, starter
Vic Power, reserve

Farm system 

LEAGUE CHAMPIONS: LancasterWelch franchise transferred to Marion and renamed, July 14, 1955

References

External links
1955 Kansas City Athletics team page at Baseball Reference
1955 Kansas City Athletics team page at www.baseball-almanac.com

Oakland Athletics seasons
Kansas City Athletics season
1955 in sports in Missouri